Natalicio Talavera (1839–1867) was a Paraguayan poet and journalist. Talavera became known as one of the first post-independence Paraguayan poets. He died of disease while serving in the Paraguayan War, which he covered extensively.

Biography 
Talavera was born in Villarrica, Paraguay on 8 September 1839. Born into a wealth family, he was educated in Villarrica and later in Asunción. During the 1850s, he became a member of the "Aurora" movement (often described as a group or school), a collection of young Paraguayan philosophers and authors.

Following the outbreak of the Paraguayan War in 1865, Talavera enlisted in the Paraguayan army. While serving in the army, he wrote reports of the war that came to be read by both sides of the conflict. In 1867, he started publishing an army newspaper catering to the Paraguayan army, hoping to raise morale. However, while encamped with the army near Humaitá, Talavera contracted cholera and his health went into decline. He finished his last missive on 28 September before dying on 11 October 1867.

Legacy 
Talavera's work is considered part of the Latin American romanticist movement, and he is noted in some sources as the main poet of Paraguayan Romanticism. He was posthumously awarded the National Order of Merit, and 11 October was declared Day of the Paraguayan Poet by the Paraguayan government in 1972.

The town of Natalicio Talavera, founded in 1918, is named after him.

References 

1839 births
1867 deaths
People from Villarrica, Paraguay
Paraguayan people of Spanish descent
Paraguayan poets
Paraguayan journalists
Paraguayan Army officers
Paraguayan military personnel of the Paraguayan War